The United States Attorney for the Districts of Guam and the Northern Mariana Islands is the United States Attorney responsible for representing the federal government in civil and criminal litigation before the United States territorial courts of the District Court of Guam, whose jurisdiction is the Territory of Guam, and the District Court for the Northern Mariana Islands, whose jurisdiction is the United States Commonwealth of the Northern Mariana Islands (CNMI), encompassing the main islands of Saipan, Tinian and Rota as well as the mostly uninhabited "Northern Islands" of the Commonwealth.

Although the Territory of Guam and the CNMI are separate political entities and federal judicial districts, since 1978 the law has authorized the appointment of one United States Attorney to serve both. This situation is unique within the entire United States.

The U.S. Attorney maintains offices in Hagåtña, Guam and in Gualo Rai, Saipan.

List of U.S. Attorneys for the District of Guam and the *District of the Northern Mariana Islands
James G. Mackey:  1950 - 1952* 
John P. Raker:  1952 - 1954* 
Herbert G. Homme, Jr.:  1954 - 1962* 
James Pace Alger:  1962 - 1969* 
Duane K. Craske:  1969 - 1975* 
Ralph F. Bagley:  1975 - 1977* 
David T. Wood:  1977 - 1986
K. William O'Connor:  1986 - 1989 
D. Paul Vernier:  1989 - 1991 
Frederick A. Black:  1991 - 2003
Leonardo Matias Rapadas:  June 2003 - June 2010
Alicia Anne Garrido Limtiaco:  21 June 2010 - 10 March 2017
Shawn N. Anderson:  4 January 2018 - present

 *Prior to 1978, incumbents did not hold both offices, as the latter had not been created.

See also
 District Court of Guam
 District Court for the Northern Mariana Islands

Notes

Footnotes

Citations

External links
 U.S. Attorney for the Districts of Guam and the Northern Mariana Islands (Official website)

United States Attorneys
Guamanian lawyers
Northern Mariana Islands lawyers